Carey Mecole Hardman Jr. (born March 12, 1998) is an American football wide receiver for the Kansas City Chiefs of the National Football League (NFL). He played college football at Georgia and was drafted by the Chiefs in the second round of the 2019 NFL Draft.

Early years
Hardman attended Elbert County High School in Elbert County, Georgia. A five-star recruit, he committed to the University of Georgia to play college football.

College career
Hardman played at Georgia from 2016 to 2018. During his career, he had 60 receptions for 961 yards and 11 touchdowns. As a return specialist, he had 39 punt returns for 592 yards and a touchdown and 35 kick returns for 875 yards. One significant touchdown came in his sophomore year against Alabama in the College Football Playoff National Championship. He caught an 80-yard pass from Jake Fromm in the third quarter of the 26–23 overtime loss. After his junior season, he decided to forgo his senior year and enter the 2019 NFL Draft.

College statistics

Professional career

Hardman was selected by the Kansas City Chiefs in the second round with the 56th overall pick in the 2019 NFL Draft. He was the fifth wide receiver selected that year.

2019 season
During Week 2 against the Oakland Raiders, Hardman caught four passes for 61 yards and his first NFL touchdown in the 28–10 road victory. In the Week 3 game against the Baltimore Ravens, he caught two passes for 97 yards including an 83-yard receiving touchdown. The Chiefs defeated the Ravens 33-28. During a Week 10 35-32 road loss against the Tennessee Titans, Hardman had a 63-yard touchdown on his only reception of the game. On December 17, Hardman was named to the Pro Bowl. In the regular-season finale against the Los Angeles Chargers, Hardman caught a 30-yard reception and returned a kickoff for a 104 yard touchdown in the 31–21 win. In Super Bowl LIV, Hardman had a single reception for two yards while returning three kicks for a total of 58 yards in a 31-20 win against the San Francisco 49ers.

2020 season
During a Week 3 game against the Baltimore Ravens, Hardman caught four passes for 81 yards including a 49-yard receiving touchdown. The Chiefs won 34-20.  In a Week 8 35-9 victory against the New York Jets, Hardman caught seven passes for 96 yards including a 30-yard receiving touchdown. On November 11, 2020, Hardman was placed on the reserve/COVID-19 list after testing positive for COVID-19, and was activated on November 21. Hardman missed no games while on the reserve/COVID-19 list, but his snaps were limited in the Chiefs' Week 11 victory against the Las Vegas Raiders. His only reception in the game came on the team's game-winning drive with 1:14 remaining in the fourth quarter. In the Chiefs' Week 14 victory over the Miami Dolphins, Hardman returned a punt for 67 yards for a touchdown, the first punt return touchdown of his career. Overall, Hardman recorded 41	receptions for 560 receiving yards and four receiving touchdowns to go along with a punt return touchdown in the 2020 season.

In the AFC Championship Game against the Buffalo Bills, Hardman muffed a punt return that the Bills recovered at the 3-yard line which was later converted into a touchdown. However, on the next Chiefs drive, Hardman caught a touchdown pass and later rushed for a 50-yard jet sweep. The Chiefs would win 38–24 advancing to Super Bowl LV. In the Super Bowl, Hardman caught two passes for four yards in a 31–9 loss to the Tampa Bay Buccaneers.

2021 season
In the 2021 season, Hardman played in all 17 games and recorded 59 receptions for 693 yards and two touchdowns while handling a majority of the punt return duties. In the postseason, Hardman scored a rushing touchdown in the Divisional Round and a receiving touchdown in the AFC Championship.

2022 season
In Week 1 against the Arizona Cardinals, Hardman had three receptions for 16 yards and a touchdown. In Week 7 against the San Francisco 49ers, Hardman recorded four catches for 32 yards and a receiving touchdown to go along with 28 rushing yards and two rushing touchdowns. He became the first wide receiver in the Super Bowl era to get two rushing touchdowns and a receiving touchdown in the same game. He was placed on injured reserve on November 17, 2022 after suffering an abdomen injury in Week 9. Hardman was activated off of injured reserve on January 4, 2023. Hardman did return in the AFC Championship Game but injured his abdominal and was deactivated for Super Bowl LVII. The Chiefs defeated the Philadelphia Eagles 38-35 to give Hardman his second Super Bowl ring.

NFL career statistics

Regular season

Postseason

References

External links
Kansas City Chiefs bio
Georgia Bulldogs bio

1998 births
Living people
People from Elbert County, Georgia
Players of American football from Georgia (U.S. state)
American football return specialists
American football wide receivers
Georgia Bulldogs football players
Kansas City Chiefs players